The men's 1500 metres event at the 2013 Summer Universiade was held on 7–9 July.

Medalists

Results

Heats
Qualification: First 3 in each heat (Q) and the next 3 fastest (q) qualified for the final.

Final

References 

1500
2013